is Japanese band Greeeen's third studio album released on June 10, 2009. There is a limited edition having DVD. There is another limited edition having bonus track "Kiseki".

With the sales of over 101,000 copies in the first day, the album debuted at number-one position on the Oricon daily album charts. The album debuted at the number-one position on the Oricon weekly album charts, selling over 452,000 copies in its first week. It became their 2nd album to be awarded Million status by RIAJ.

The album has a hidden track, which was untitled when the album released. The song was later named "Hige, Kosō" (髭、コソウ).

Track listing

Charts

References 

Greeeen albums
2009 albums